Mantzios is a Greek surname. Notable people with the surname include:

Apostolos Mantzios (born 1969), Greek footballer and manager
Vangelis Mantzios (born 1983), Greek footballer

Greek-language surnames